

397001–397100 

|-bgcolor=#f2f2f2
| colspan=4 align=center | 
|}

397101–397200 

|-bgcolor=#f2f2f2
| colspan=4 align=center | 
|}

397201–397300 

|-id=278
| 397278 Arvidson ||  || Raymond Arvidson (born 1948), a Professor of Earth and Planetary Science at Washington University in St. Louis || 
|-id=279
| 397279 Bloomsburg ||  || The U.S. town of Bloomsburg, Pennsylvania, home to Bloomsburg University || 
|}

397301–397400 

|-bgcolor=#f2f2f2
| colspan=4 align=center | 
|}

397401–397500 

|-bgcolor=#f2f2f2
| colspan=4 align=center | 
|}

397501–397600 

|-bgcolor=#f2f2f2
| colspan=4 align=center | 
|}

397601–397700 

|-bgcolor=#f2f2f2
| colspan=4 align=center | 
|}

397701–397800 

|-bgcolor=#f2f2f2
| colspan=4 align=center | 
|}

397801–397900 

|-bgcolor=#f2f2f2
| colspan=4 align=center | 
|}

397901–398000 

|-bgcolor=#f2f2f2
| colspan=4 align=center | 
|}

References 

397001-398000